American McGee Presents: Scrapland is a game developed by MercurySteam, with American McGee as a executive producer and published by Enlight Software. A remastered version was released for Microsoft Windows on December 13, 2021.

Setting
Scrapland's story is set in the robot-populated world of the same name, also known by the inhabitants as Chimera, which seems like a giant asteroid vastly industrialized as a metropolis and surrounded by a world-scaled energy field and an orbital ring, both used to control entrance and exit of the planet.

Development
According to American McGee, the game was designed and produced by Enrique Alvarez, the studio head at Mercury Steam. McGee refers to himself as a "marketing tool". Alvarez pitched the idea for Scrapland to McGee while McGee was working as an executive producer at Enlight.

Reception

Scrapland received "average" reviews on both platforms according to video game review aggregator Metacritic. Game Informer criticized the Xbox version's on-foot sections, "which would appear to be in the game for the sole purpose of annoying people. Scrap indeed." IGN gave the same console version a more positive review, saying "I would have liked to have seen more variety and lateral flexibility in the single-player... Overall, the game's refreshing sense of personality wins out over everything else."

The editors of Computer Gaming World nominated Scrapland for their 2004 "Action Game of the Year" award, which ultimately went to The Chronicles of Riddick: Escape from Butcher Bay.

References

External links
 

2004 video games
Action-adventure games
Open-world video games
Video games about robots
Science fiction video games
Video games developed in Spain
Windows games
Xbox games
Video games set in the future
Multiplayer and single-player video games
Post-apocalyptic video games
Deep Silver games